British United Air Ferries (BUAF) was a wholly private, British independent car and passenger ferry airline based in the United Kingdom during the 1960s. It specialised in cross-Channel ferry flights carrying cars and their owners between its numerous bases in Southern England, the Channel Islands and Continental Europe. All-passenger and all-cargo flights were operated as well. Following several identity and ownership changes, it went out of business in 2001.

In its final years, as British World Airlines, its head office was at Viscount House, London Southend Airport.

History
BUAF came into being on 1 January 1963 as a result of the merger of Channel Air Bridge and Silver City Airways. The newly formed airline was a wholly owned subsidiary of Air Holdings, which in turn was a subsidiary of British & Commonwealth (B&C). This ownership structure made BUAF a sister airline of British United Airways (BUA), at the time Britain's biggest independent airline and the country's leading independent scheduled operator.

BUAF operated scheduled and non-scheduled vehicle ferry, passenger and freight services. This included scheduled routes from Southend, Lydd Ferryfield and Hurn to ten points in the Channel Islands and Continental Europe. Aviation Traders Carvairs operated what the airline called "deeper penetration" routes to Basle, Geneva and Strasbourg.

Bristol Superfreighters plied the routes to Jersey, Guernsey, Cherbourg, Le Touquet, Calais, Ostend and Rotterdam.

The airline's scheduled services between the UK, Le Touquet and Ostend formed part of rail-air operations linking the respective capital cities at each end. These were operated in conjunction with Société Nationale des Chemins de Fer français (SNCF) and Société Nationale des Chemins de fer Belges/Nationale Maatschappij der Belgische Spoorwegen (SNCB/NMBS), the respective national railway companies of France and Belgium. (Amongst these, was a six-times daily Southend—Ostend vehicle ferry service operated in conjunction with erstwhile Belgian flag carrier Sabena. This service, which had been launched by Air Charter in partnership with Sabena in 1957 with three dedicated Superfreighters in full Sabena livery and which BUAF had inherited from Channel Air Bridge, continued until 1964.) Coach-air services were provided in conjunction with local coach operators between the UK, France, Belgium, the Netherlands and Switzerland via Calais, Ostend, Rotterdam and Basle.

In addition, all-passenger configured Bristol Freighters/Superfreighters were used for inclusive tour work on behalf of BUA (Services) Ltd. Sister airline BUA (C.I.) assumed the former Silver City routes linking the North of England with the Channel Isles and the Continent.

BUAF subsequently added routes linking Southampton with Rotterdam, Ostend, Calais, Deauville, Le Touquet, Jersey, Guernsey, Dinard and Cherbourg to its scheduled route network, while discontinuing its "deeper penetration" routes to Basle, Geneva and Strasbourg as these generated insufficient traffic to sustain a viable operation. Some of the new Southampton routes were part of rail-air operations in conjunction with the French and Belgian national railway companies as well.

British Air Ferries (BAF)
As a consequence of B&C's reorganisation of the BUA group of companies during 1967/8, BUAF changed its name to British Air Ferries (BAF) in September 1967.

In October 1971, BAF's ownership passed from Air Holdings to the Keegan family.

In 1972, BAF became a wholly owned subsidiary of Transmeridian Air Cargo (TMAC), a Stansted-based all-cargo airline controlled by the Keegan family.

In 1975, BAF began replacing its remaining Carvairs with Handley Page Dart Herald turboprops on its cross-Channel routes linking Southend with Le Touquet, Ostend and Rotterdam. This resulted in these services being converted into ordinary passenger schedules and the Carvairs being transferred to cargo flying.

On 1 January 1977, BAF operated its last car ferry service. Later the same year, on 31 October, BAF Herald G-BDFE operating the airline's inaugural scheduled passenger flight from Southend to Düsseldorf under the command of Captain Caroline Frost and First Officer Lesley Hardy became Britain's first airliner flown by an all-female crew.

On 1 January 1979, BAF transferred its entire scheduled operation including associated aircraft and staff to British Island Airways (BIA).

Following British Airways's decision to withdraw from its loss-making regional routes and to retire its Vickers Viscount turboprop fleet, BAF acquired the entire 18-strong fleet along with the spares inventory during the early 1980s. This acquisition made it the world's largest Viscount operator at the time.

As a result of the changes the airline underwent in the late 1970s and early 1980s, BAF mainly concentrated on leasing, charter and oil industry support work.

In 1983, the Keegans put some of their businesses into receivership and in March of that year, sold the British Air Ferries name along with the airline's commercial flying operations to the Jadepoint investment group for £2m.

Growing financial difficulties at Jadepoint resulted in BAF being placed in administration in January 1988. A new holding company, called Mostjet, was formed within a year to enable the airline to emerge from administration in May 1989, the only British airline to do so at the time.

British World Airlines (BWA)

In April 1993, BAF was renamed British World Airlines (BWA), ICAO code BWL.

Following delivery of BWA's first ATR 72 on 1 April 1996, the airline converted its three remaining passenger-configured Viscounts to freighters. On 18 April the same year, BWA Viscount G-APEY operated the type's last passenger flight, marking the 43rd anniversary of the Viscount's entry into full commercial air service with British European Airways (BEA).

BWA ceased trading on 14 December 2001, as a result of the tough business climate during the post-9/11 downturn.

Fleet

BUAF/BAF/BWA operated the following aircraft types:

 Aviation Traders ATL 98 Carvair (BUAF/BAF)
 ATR 72-200 (BWA)
 BAC One-Eleven 200 (BAF)
 BAC One-Eleven 500 (BWA)
 BAe ATP (BWA)
 BAe 146-100 (BAF)/200 (BAF)/300 (BWA)
 Bristol 170 Freighter Mark 21E (BUAF)
 Bristol 170 Freighter Mark 31 (BUAF)
 Bristol 170 Superfreighter Mark 32 (BUAF/BAF)
 Boeing 727-200 (BAF)
 Boeing 737-300 (BWA)
 Boeing 757-200 (BWA)
 British Aerospace ATP (BWA)
 British Aerospace 146-300 (BWA)
 Canadair CL-44 (BAF)
 Fokker F-27 600 (BAF)
 Handley Page Dart Herald 200 (BAF)
 Hawker Siddeley HS 125 (BAF)
 McDonnell-Douglas MD-80 (BAF)
 Shorts 330 (BAF)
 Shorts 360 (BAF)
 Vickers Viscount 800 (BAF/BWA).

Hovercraft
 Vickers VA3 (BAF)

In BUAF's days, all aircraft were given individual names.

Fleet in 1963
In April 1963, the BUAF fleet comprised 28 aircraft.

BUAF employed 519 people at this time.

Fleet in 1967
In September 1967, the BUAF fleet comprised 23 aircraft.

BUAF employed 633 people at this time.

Fleet in 1972
In May 1972, the BAF fleet comprised 8 aircraft.

BAF employed 300 people at this time.

Fleet in 1978
In April 1978, the BAF fleet comprised 18 aircraft.

BAF employed 450 people at this time.

Fleet in 1984
In March 1984, the BAF fleet comprised 10 aircraft.

BAF employed 165 people at this time.

Fleet in 1990
In March 1990, the BAF fleet comprised 22 aircraft.

BAF employed 450 people at this time.

Fleet in 1994
In March 1994, the BWA fleet comprised 18 aircraft.

The BWA group employed 400 people at this time.

Fleet in 1998
In March 1998, the BWA fleet comprised 9 aircraft.

BWA employed 222 people at this time.

Fleet in 2001

In December 2001, the BWA fleet comprised 15 aircraft.

Accidents and incidents
During the early part of its existence, when the airline traded as British United Air Ferries, it suffered one non-fatal incident.

On 24 September 1963, a Bristol 170 Superfreighter Mark 32 (registration: G-AMWA) was damaged beyond repair in a takeoff accident at Guernsey Airport.

Operating a scheduled passenger flight to Bournemouth, the Bristol 170 was preparing for takeoff from Guernsey Airport's runway 28. The first officer, who was flying the aircraft used full power to counteract the effects of a  crosswind. Due to a problem with the port engine the First officer decided to abort takeoff as speed approached 80 knots. As the aircraft was going to overshoot the end of the runway he steered it to the left to avoid hitting obstacles. The aircraft became airborne for a short distance, crashing through the airport boundary fence, crossing a public road and coming to a halt a quarter of a mile from the runway end. Although the aircraft was a complete write-off, there were no fatalities among the four occupants (three crew and one passenger).

The accident investigators established the probable cause of the accident as the inability of the pilot in command to bring the aircraft to a stop within the remaining runway length, following his decision to abandon the takeoff due to a malfunction of the port engine, .

The company suffered two non-fatal incidents during the British Air Ferries era.

Vickers Viscount 806 G-APIM Viscount Stephen Piercey,
was hit on 11 January 1988 by a Fairflight Shorts 330 (registration: G-BHWT), which had suffered a nosegear brake and steering failure while preparing to take off from Southend Airport to Fairflight's Biggin Hill base. The collision destroyed the left-hand side of the Viscount's nose. Although the aircraft was deemed damaged beyond economical repair, it was subsequently restored and put on display at the Brooklands Museum.

The final two recorded incidents occurred during the British World period. One of these involved fatalities.

On 25 February 1994, a BWA Vickers Viscount 813 (registration: G-OHOT) operating an all-cargo flight from Edinburgh to Coventry encountered severe icing conditions en route. This caused the no. 2 engine to fail and its propeller to autofeather while the aircraft had begun its descent from flight level (FL) 150. During that time, the no. 3 engine started losing power as well. In response air traffic control immediately cleared the flightdeck crew to descend to FL070 and thereafter, FL050. The crew attempted to restart the no. 2 and 3 engines but when this proved futile, they elected to divert to Birmingham. The crew did manage to restart the no. 2 engine but this was followed by failure of no. 4. Five minutes short of Birmingham, the aircraft lost all electrical power and as a result radio navigation and intercom.

The official accident investigation report of the UK's Air Accidents Investigation Branch (AAIB) identified the several factors as the likely cause:
 Multiple engine failures were a consequence of extreme icing conditions.
 The flightdeck crew's failure to complete the emergency drills as a result of not referring to the emergency checklist prejudiced their chances of restarting the engines successfully.
 The crew's actions to secure and restart the failed engines, which did not comply with the operator's procedures, restricted the power that was available.
 The drag induced by the failed engines' unfeathered propellers and the weight increase suffered by the heavily iced airframe caused a loss of height and control before reaching the diversion airfield.
 The crew had no contingency plan to avoid the forecast severe icing conditions and was unaware of the relative position of a closer diversion airfield that could have been chosen by using ATC services more effectively. This constituted poor crew resource management, which reduced the potential for emergency planning, decision making and workload sharing.

Film and TV appearances
BUAF aircraft appeared in the following feature films and TV series:

 In the opening scenes of the 1966 film That Riviera Touch, Eric Morecambe and Ernie Wise, better known as Morecambe and Wise, along with their elderly car, fly to Le Touquet in a BUAF Bristol Superfreighter.
 A BUAF Superfreighter is seen in the 1965 film Hysteria flying Robert Webber and his girlfriend abroad.
 A BUAF Carvair is seen transporting Auric Goldfinger and his car in the James Bond film Goldfinger from Southend Airport to Geneva.
 A BUAF Carvair is featured in several brief scenes (cars being loaded, taking off, taxi-ing) in The Sentimental Agent episode (six) 'Meet my son Henry'.
 BUAF's car ferry service is shown in the episode "Racist" of the Anthony Quayle series The Strange Report.
 A BUAF aircraft is seen in the opening scene of the video clip for the song "Do-Wah-Doo". The song "Do-Wah-Doo" is performed and written by Kate Nash. It was released in early 2010.
 Albert Finney and Audrey Hepburn use a BUAF car ferry service in Stanley Donen's film Two for the Road.
 BAF aircraft are seen in the background of scenes shot at Jersey Airport on several occasions in the BBC detective series Bergerac.
 A BWA BAC111 (G-OBWA)is seen in the BBC high-tech series “Bugs” in the Season 1 episode “All Under Control”.
 A BUAF 737 is seen in Series 4 Episode 11 of Airline, operating a service from London Luton to Palma, Majorca on hire for easyJet.

See also
 List of defunct airlines of the United Kingdom

Notes
Notes

Citations

References
 
  (various backdated issues relating to British United Air ferries, 1963–1967)

Further reading
  (Aircraft Illustrated online)

External links

 
 British United Air Ferries, Air Commerce, Flight International, 2 August 1962, p. 155
 British United Air Ferries, Air Commerce ..., Flight International, 2 August 1962, p. 156
 British United Air Ferries at the Aviation Safety Network Database
 British Air Ferries at the Aviation Safety Network Database
 British World Airlines at the Aviation Safety Network Database
 British World Airlines Ltd.
 BUAF/BAF/BUA flight schedules & timetables
  Pictures of BUAF aircraft at Airliners.net

Defunct airlines of the United Kingdom
Airlines established in 1963
Airlines disestablished in 2001